Teodora Ginés (1530–1598) was a Dominican musician and composer. She is credited as the creator of the song titled  "Son de la Má Teodora".

Life
Ginés was formally a slave, born in Santiago de los Caballeros, Dominican Republic, but was freed. Along with her sister, Micaela, she emigrated to Cuba, where they were both engaged at the orchestra at the Cathedral of Santiago de Cuba: Micaela as a violinist, and Teodora playing the Bandola.

Teodora is credited with the authorship of the song " Son de la Má Teodora", circa 1562. This song was transcribed by the Cuban Laureano Fuentes Matons, in his book "The Arts in Santiago de Cuba" published in 1893. Matons argued that the "Son de la Má Teodora" was the first in Cuban history.

References

External links

1530 births
1598 deaths
16th-century composers
16th-century Dominican Republic people
16th-century Cuban people
16th-century women composers